Dober may refer to:

 Dobër, a settlement in northern Albania, today part of the municipality Malësi e Madhe
 Dober (Kremnitz), a river of Thuringia and Bavaria, Germany, tributary of the Kremnitz
 Andreas Dober (born 1986), Austrian football player
 Drew Dober (born 1988), American mixed martial artist
 Johann Leonhard Dober (1706–1766), one of the two first missionaries of the Moravian Brethren (Herrnhuter Brüdergemeine) in the West Indies 
 Richard Dessureault-Dober (born 1981), Canadian sprint kayaker
 Con Conrad (né Conrad K. Dober, 1891–1938), American songwriter and producer